Sir Percy Joseph Sillitoe KBE DL (22 May 1888 – 5 April 1962) was a chief constable of several police forces. He changed the role of radios, civilian staff, and women police officers within the police. He was later Director General of MI5, the United Kingdom's internal security service, from 1946 to 1953.

Life
Born in London, Sillitoe was educated at St Paul's Cathedral School (then St Paul's Cathedral Choir School). By 1908, he had become a Trooper in the British South Africa Police and, in 1911, transferred to the Northern Rhodesia Police. During the First World War he took part in the German East Africa campaign. After serving as a political officer in Tanganyika from 1916 to 1920, he returned to England with his family.

In 1923 he was appointed Chief Constable of Chesterfield, a position he held for the next two years. After a further year as Chief Constable of the East Riding of Yorkshire in 1925, he became in 1926 the Chief Constable of Sheffield, where he was credited with authorising "reasonable force" to break the hold of criminal gangs.

He was Chief Constable of City of Glasgow Police from 1931 to 1943, when he was credited with breaking the power of the notorious Glasgow razor gangs, made infamous in the novel No Mean City. During his time as chief constable of Glasgow, he was also credited with the introduction of wireless radios allowing communication between headquarters and vehicles, which previously relied completely upon the use of police boxes, use of civilians in police-related roles, and the introduction of compulsory retirement after 30 years service. He is further credited with the introduction of the Sillitoe tartan which is more commonly recognized as the black and white diced pattern on police cap bands, originally based on that used by several Scottish regiments on the Glengarry.

In 1944 Sillitoe was made the chief constable of Kent and he employed Barbara Denis de Vitre to lead the women's force. When she arrived Kent had two policewomen and the following year there were nearly 150.

Sillitoe went on to head MI5. His reputation was damaged by the 1951 defection to the Soviet Union of the spies Guy Burgess and Donald Duart Maclean, and by the investigation afterwards, which showed that MI5 had been unaware and slow to act.

He was made a Commander of the Order of the British Empire (CBE) in 1936 and knighted in the 1942 New Year Honours.

References

Sources
 P. Sillitoe, Cloak without dagger, 1955
 A. E. Cockerill, Sir Percy Sillitoe, 1975
 R. Deacon, The greatest treason: the bizarre story of Hollis, Liddell and Mountbatten, rev. edn 1990
 The Times, Obituary, 6 April 1962

External links
 The Glasgow Story – Chief Constable Sir Percy Sillitoe

1888 births
1962 deaths
People from Tulse Hill
Knights Commander of the Order of the British Empire
British Chief Constables
Directors General of MI5
British colonial police officers
Colonial Administrative Service officers
British South Africa Police officers
People educated at St. Paul's Cathedral School
Deputy Lieutenants of Glasgow
Knights Bachelor